Cameron Dokey (born 1956) is an American author. She lives in Seattle, Washington with her three cats and her husband.
Cameron was born in the Central Valley of California.  Her father was a teacher of Philosophy, Creative Writing, and Western Literature, and perhaps for this reason, Cameron grew up reading classical literature and mythology. Both Cameron's parents are authors. Her mother's work is less well-known than that of her father. Cameron's grandmother, Mabel, was a singer on the radio in the early decades of the 20th century.

Cameron studied Archaeology at Sonoma State University just prior to extending her high school career as an actress by acting for several years at the Oregon Shakespeare Festival, in Ashland, Oregon. Cameron then moved to Seattle, where she continued acting at several locations including the Seattle Rep.  It was in Seattle that Cameron met her husband, Jim Verdery.

After several years of acting and working in different capacities, Cameron has settled into writing.

Works

Hearts and Dreams
 Katherine: Hearts and Dreams
 Charlotte: Heart of Hope
 Stephanie: Heart of Gold
 Carrie: Heart of Courage

Fear Street Saga novels

 The Sign of Fear
 Dance of Death
 Faces of Terror
 The Hand of Power
 The Raven Woman (Advertised but unpublished)

Buffy & Angel novels
Here Be Monsters (Buffy novel)
The Summoned (Angel novel)
How I Survived My Summer Vacation (Buffy story anthology; two stories)

Charmed novels
Haunted by Desire
Truth and Consequences
Picture Perfect

Once Upon A Time novels
The Storyteller's Daughter (A Retelling of The Arabian Nights)
Beauty Sleep (A Retelling of Sleeping Beauty)
Sunlight and Shadow (A Retelling of The Magic Flute)
Golden (A Retelling of Rapunzel)
Before Midnight (A Retelling of Cinderella)
Belle (A Retelling of Beauty and the Beast)
Wild Orchid (A Retelling of The Ballad of Mulan) (2009)
Winter's Child (A Retelling of The Snow Queen)
The World Above (A Retelling of Jack and the Beanstalk and Robin Hood)

Mystery Date Novels
Love Me, Love Me Not
Blue Moon
Heart's Desire

The Blair Witch Files

The Prisoner
The Obsession

Other works
How NOT to Spend Your Senior Year
Forget Me Not (Mary-Kate and Ashley Sweet 16 series 17)
Hindenburg, 1937
The Talisman
Washington Avalanche, 1910
Together Forever

References

External links

Fantasticfiction.co.uk - Bookography

1956 births
Living people
20th-century American novelists
21st-century American novelists
20th-century American women writers
21st-century American women writers
Sonoma State University alumni
American fantasy writers
American horror novelists
Women science fiction and fantasy writers
Women horror writers
American women novelists